Acroclita discariana is a species of moth in the family Tortricidae. It is endemic to New Zealand.  It is classified as Nationally Vulnerable by the Department of Conservation.

Taxonomy 
This species was first described by Alfred Philpott in 1930 using a specimen collected by Stuart Lindsay at Porter River. Philpott named the species Acroclita discariana. The genus level classification of this species is regarded as unsatisfactory. As such this species is also currently known as Acroclita (s.l.) discariana. The holotype specimen is held at Canterbury Museum.

Description 
Philpott described the species as follows:

Distribution 
This species is endemic to New Zealand. The species range of this moth is Marlborough, North Canterbury and Mid Canterbury. The occurrence of A. discariana is patchy within this range. Other than its type locality, this species has been collected at Motunau/Gore Bay Beach, Cass, Jacks Pass in Hamner, Amberley Beach, Famish Stream in the Upper Wairau Valley, and the Culverden Scientific Reserve,

Biology and life cycle 
The larvae of A. discariana make distinctive webbing on their host plant. It is very tough, white and is formed at the stem axils of their host. The webbing can be as large as 30 cm in diameter. The species inhabits this webbing both as larvae and pupae. The adult moth is day flying. The species is on the wing in October and November.

Host species 
The host species for this moth is the endemic plant Discaria toumatou.

Conservation status
This moth is classified under the New Zealand Threat Classification system as being Nationally Vulnerable.

References

External links 

Image of adult moth, species confirmed by entomologist Brian Patrick.

Eucosmini
Moths of New Zealand
Endemic fauna of New Zealand
Moths described in 1930
Endangered biota of New Zealand
Endemic moths of New Zealand